Events in the year 2017 in Greece.

Incumbents
President: Prokopis Pavlopoulos
Prime Minister: Alexis Tsipras

Events

13 May – Three people are killed when a train derails in Adendro and hits a house.
12 June – The 6.3  Lesbos earthquake shook the area with a maximum Mercalli intensity of IX (Violent), killing one and injuring ten.
21 July – The 6.6  Aegean Sea earthquake shook the area with a maximum Mercalli intensity of VII (Very strong), killing two and injuring 480+.
15 November – In one of the greatest disasters in the area in decades, flash floods hit Western Attica, particularly the Athens suburb of Mandra, killing twenty-three.

Deaths

13 January – Magic Alex, or Yanni Alexis Mardas, electronics engineer (b. 1942).
7 February – Konstantinos Despotopoulos, philosopher and politician, MP (b. 1913)
17 February – Evangelos Basiakos, politician, MP (b. 1954).                                      
29 May – Konstantinos Mitsotakis, Former Greek Prime Minister (b. 1918).
5 June – Giorgos Masadis, footballer (b. 1944)

References

 
Greece
Greece
2010s in Greece
Years of the 21st century in Greece